The men's 400 metres hurdles at the 1938 European Athletics Championships was held in Paris, France, at Stade Olympique de Colombes on 3 and 4 September 1938.

Medalists

Results

Final
4 September

Heats
3 September

Heat 1

Heat 2

Heat 3

Participation
According to an unofficial count, 13 athletes from 10 countries participated in the event.

 (1)
 (2)
 (2)
 (1)
 (1)
 (1)
 (1)
 (1)
 (2)
 (1)

References

400 metres hurdles
400 metres hurdles at the European Athletics Championships